Rosindale is an unincorporated community in Bladen County, North Carolina, United States.

Notable people
Aaron McDuffie Moore, physician, was born in Rosindale.
George Henry White, member of the United States House of Representatives, was born in Rosindale.

Notes

Unincorporated communities in Bladen County, North Carolina
Unincorporated communities in North Carolina